Maurice McLoughlin defeated Stanley Doust 6–3, 6–4, 7–5 in the All Comers' Final, but the reigning champion Anthony Wilding defeated McLoughlin 8–6, 6–3, 10–8 in the challenge round to win the gentlemen's singles tennis title at the 1913 Wimbledon Championships.

Draw

Challenge round

All-Comers' Finals

Top half

Section 1

Section 2

Section 3

Section 4

Bottom half

Section 5

Section 6

Section 7

Section 8

References

External links

Men's Singles
Wimbledon Championship by year – Men's singles